Israel, officially the State of Israel, is a country in Western Asia. Situated in the Southern Levant, it is bordered by Lebanon to the north, by Syria to the northeast, by Jordan to the east, by the Red Sea to the south, by Egypt to the southwest, by the Mediterranean Sea to the west, and by the Palestinian territories — the West Bank along the east and the Gaza Strip along the southwest. Tel Aviv is the economic and technological center of the country, while its seat of government is in its proclaimed capital of Jerusalem, although Israeli sovereignty over East Jerusalem is unrecognized internationally.

Israel and the Israeli-occupied territories are located in the Holy Land, a region of great significance to the Abrahamic religions. In ancient history, it was where Canaanite and Israelite civilizations developed, while in the early first millennium BCE the kingdoms of Israel and Judah emerged, before falling to the Neo-Assyrian and Neo-Babylonian empires, respectively. During the classical era, the region was ruled by the Achaemenid, Macedonian, Ptolemaic and Seleucid empires. In the 2nd century BCE, an independent Hasmonean kingdom emerged, before Rome conquered the area a century later. In the 7th century, the Muslim conquest of the Levant established caliphal rule. The First Crusade of the 11th century brought the founding of Crusader states, the last ending in the 13th century at the hands of the Mamluks, who lost the area to the Ottoman Empire at the onset of the 16th century. In late 19th century, Jews began immigrating to the area as part of the Zionist movement. After World War I, the allied powers assigned the Mandate for Palestine to Britain, which during the war made a declaration of support for the establishment of a national home for the Jewish people in Palestine. Following World War II and the Holocaust, the newly formed United Nations adopted the Partition Plan for Palestine, recommending the creation of independent Arab and Jewish states, and placing Jerusalem under international control.

After a civil war between Palestinian Arab forces and the Yishuv, Israel declared independence on 14 May 1948 at the termination of the British Mandate. A day later, the surrounding Arab countries intervened, leading to the 1948 Arab–Israeli War, which concluded with the 1949 Armistice Agreements that saw Israel in control of most of the former mandate territory, while the West Bank and Gaza were held by Jordan and Egypt respectively. Over 700,000 Palestinian Arabs were expelled from or fled the territory Israel would come to control, with fewer than 150,000 Palestinian Arabs remaining within Israel. During and immediately after the war, around 260,000 Jews emigrated or fled from the Arab world to Israel. Israel has since fought wars with several Arab countries, and since the 1967 Six-Day War has occupied the Syrian Golan Heights and the Palestinian territories of the West Bank, including East Jerusalem, and the Gaza Strip—the longest military occupation in modern history—though whether Gaza remains occupied following the Israeli disengagement is disputed. Israel has effectively annexed East Jerusalem and the Golan Heights, and established settlements within the occupied territories, though these actions have been rejected as illegal by the international community. While Israel has signed peace treaties with Egypt and Jordan, and has normalized relations with a number of other Arab countries, it remains formally at war with Syria and Lebanon, and efforts to resolve the Israeli–Palestinian conflict have thus far stalled.

The country has a parliamentary system, proportional representation, and universal suffrage. The prime minister serves as head of government, and is elected by the Knesset, Israel's unicameral legislature. Israel is a developed country and an OECD member, with a population of over 9 million people . It has the world's 28th-largest economy by nominal GDP, and ranks twenty-second in the Human Development Index.

Etymology

Under the British Mandate (1920–1948), the whole region was known as 'Palestine'. Upon independence in 1948, the country formally adopted the name 'State of Israel' after other proposed historical and religious names including 'Land of Israel' (Eretz Israel), Ever (from ancestor Eber), Zion, and Judea, were considered but rejected, while the name 'Israel' was suggested by Ben-Gurion and passed by a vote of 6–3. In the early weeks of independence, the government chose the term "Israeli" to denote a citizen of Israel, with the formal announcement made by Minister of Foreign Affairs Moshe Sharett.

The names Land of Israel and Children of Israel have historically been used to refer to the biblical Kingdom of Israel and the entire Jewish people respectively. The name 'Israel' (Hebrew: Yisraʾel, Isrāʾīl; Septuagint , Israēl, 'El (God) persists/rules', though after  often interpreted as 'struggle with God') in these phrases refers to the patriarch Jacob who, according to the Hebrew Bible, was given the name after he successfully wrestled with the angel of the Lord. Jacob's twelve sons became the ancestors of the Israelites, also known as the Twelve Tribes of Israel or Children of Israel. Jacob and his sons had lived in Canaan but were forced by famine to go into Egypt for four generations, lasting 430 years, until Moses, a great-great-grandson of Jacob, led the Israelites back into Canaan during the "Exodus". The earliest known archaeological artefact to mention the word "Israel" as a collective is the Merneptah Stele of ancient Egypt (dated to the late 13th century BCE).

History

Prehistory

The Southern Levant experienced human residence, agricultural communities, and civilization among the first in the globe. The oldest evidence of early humans in the territory of modern Israel, dating to 1.5 million years ago, was found in Ubeidiya near the Sea of Galilee. Other notable Paleolithic sites include the caves Tabun, Qesem and Manot. The oldest fossils of anatomically modern humans found outside Africa are the Skhul and Qafzeh hominins, who lived in the area that is now northern Israel 120,000 years ago. Around the 10th millennium BCE, the Natufian culture existed in the area.

Antiquity

The Canaanites are archaeologically attested in the Middle Bronze Age (2100–1550 BCE). During the Late Bronze Age (1550–1200 BCE), large parts of Canaan formed vassal states paying tribute to the New Kingdom of Egypt. As a result of the Late Bronze Age collapse, Canaan fell into chaos, and Egyptian control over the region collapsed completely. There is evidence that urban centers such as Hazor, Beit She'an, Megiddo, Ekron, Ashdod and Ashkelon were damaged or destroyed.

A people named Israel appear for the first time in the Merneptah Stele, an ancient Egyptian inscription which dates to about 1200 BCE. Ancestors of the Israelites are thought to have included ancient Semitic-speaking peoples native to this area. According to the modern archaeological account, the Israelites and their culture branched out of the Canaanite peoples and their cultures through the development of a distinct monolatristic—and later monotheistic—religion centered on Yahweh. They spoke an archaic form of the Hebrew language, known as Biblical Hebrew. Around the same time, the Philistines settled on the southern coastal plain.

Modern archaeology has largely discarded the historicity of the narrative in the Torah concerning the patriarchs, The Exodus, and the conquest of Canaan described in the Book of Joshua, and instead views the narrative as constituting the Israelites' national myth. However, some elements of these traditions do appear to have historical roots.

There is debate about the earliest existence of the Kingdoms of Israel and Judah and their extent and power. While it is unclear if there was ever a United Kingdom of Israel, historians and archaeologists agree that the northern Kingdom of Israel existed by  900 BCE and that the Kingdom of Judah existed by  850 BCE. The Kingdom of Israel was the more prosperous of the two kingdoms and soon developed into a regional power; during the days of the Omride dynasty, it controlled Samaria, Galilee, the upper Jordan Valley, the Sharon and large parts of the Transjordan. Samaria, the capital, was home to one of the largest Iron Age structures in the Levant.

The Kingdom of Israel was destroyed around 720 BCE, when it was conquered by the Neo-Assyrian Empire. The Kingdom of Judah, with its capital in Jerusalem, later became a client state of first the Neo-Assyrian Empire and then the Neo-Babylonian Empire. It is estimated that the region's population was around 400,000 in the Iron Age II. In 587/6 BCE, the Babylonians conquered Judah. King Nebuchadnezzar II besieged and destroyed Jerusalem and Solomon's Temple, and exiled much of the Judean elite to Babylon. The defeat was also recorded in the Babylonian Chronicles. The Babylonian captivity ended around 538 BCE under the rule of the Medo-Persian Cyrus the Great after he captured Babylon.

Second Temple period 

The Second Temple was constructed around 520 BCE. The Persian Empire ruled the region as the province of Yehud, which had a population of around 30,000 people in the 5th to 4th centuries BCE.

In 332 BCE, Alexander the Great of Macedon conquered the region as part of his campaign against the Persian Empire. After his death, the area was controlled by the Ptolemaic and Seleucid empires as a part of Coele-Syria. During that period, the region underwent a process of Hellenization, which heightened tensions between Greeks, Hellenized Jews, and observant Jews. Several centuries of religious tolerance under Hellenistic rule came to an end when Antiochus IV consecrated the temple, outlawed Jewish customs, and forcibly imposed Hellenistic standards on the Jews. As a result, the Maccabean Revolt erupted in 167 BCE, and eventually led to the establishment of the independent Hasmonean Kingdom of Judea, which exploited the Seleucid Empire's weakening to expand over much of modern Israel and portions of Lebanon and Transjordan.

The Roman Republic invaded the region in 63 BCE, first taking control of Syria, and then intervening in the Hasmonean Civil War. The struggle between pro-Roman and pro-Parthian factions in Judea led to the installation of Herod the Great as a dynastic vassal of Rome. In 6 CE, the area was fully annexed as the Roman province of Judaea, a period that heralded tensions with Roman rule, and led to a series of Jewish–Roman wars, resulting in widespread destruction. The First Jewish-Roman War (66–73 CE) resulted in the destruction of Jerusalem and the Second Temple and a sizable portion of the population being killed or displaced.

Late antiquity and the medieval period 

As a result of the Bar Kokhba revolt in 132–136 CE, Judea's countryside was devastated and depopulated. Jerusalem was rebuilt as a Roman colony under the name of Aelia Capitolina, and the province of Judea was renamed Syria Palaestina. Jewish presence in the region significantly dwindled after the failure of the Bar Kokhba revolt. Jews were expelled from the districts surrounding Jerusalem, and joined communities in the diaspora. Nevertheless, there was a continuous small Jewish presence and Galilee became its religious center. Jewish communities continued to reside in the southern Hebron Hills and on the coastal plain. The Mishnah and part of the Talmud, central Jewish texts, were composed during the 2nd to 4th centuries CE. With the transition of Roman rule into that of the Byzantine Empire under Emperor Constantine, Early Christianity displaced Roman Paganism as an external influence.

With the conversion of Constantine in the 4th century, the situation for the Jewish majority in Palestine "became more difficult". Many Jews had emigrated to flourishing Diaspora communities, while locally there was both Christian immigration and local conversion. By the middle of the 5th century, there was a Christian majority. Towards the end of the 5th century, Samaritan revolts erupted, continuing until the late 6th century and resulting in a large decrease in the Samaritan population. After the Persian conquest and the installation of a short-lived Jewish Commonwealth in 614 CE, the Byzantine Empire reconquered the country in 628. 

In 634–641 CE, the Rashidun Caliphate conquered the Levant. Over the next six centuries, control of the region transferred between the Umayyad, Abbasid, Fatimid caliphates, and subsequently the Seljuks and Ayyubid dynasties. The population of the area drastically decreased during the following several centuries, dropping from an estimated 1 million during Roman and Byzantine periods to about 300,000 by the early Ottoman period. Alongside this population decline, there was a steady process of Islamization brought on by non-Muslim emigration, Muslim immigration, and local conversion to Islam. The end of the 11th century brought the Crusades, papally-sanctioned incursions of Christian crusaders intent on wresting Jerusalem and the Holy Land from Muslim control and establishing Crusader States. The Ayyubids pushed back the crusaders before Muslim rule was fully restored by the Mamluk sultans of Egypt in 1291.

Modern period and the emergence of Zionism 

In 1516, the region was conquered by the Ottoman Empire and proceeded to be ruled as a part of Ottoman Syria for the next four centuries. In 1660, a Druze revolt led to the destruction of Safed and Tiberias. In the late 18th century, local Arab Sheikh Zahir al-Umar created a de facto independent Emirate in the Galilee. Ottoman attempts to subdue the Sheikh failed, but after Zahir's death the Ottomans regained control of the area. In 1799 governor Jazzar Pasha successfully repelled an assault on Acre by troops of Napoleon, prompting the French to abandon the Syrian campaign. In 1834, a revolt by Palestinian Arab peasants broke out against Egyptian conscription and taxation policies under Muhammad Ali. Although the revolt was suppressed, Muhammad Ali's army retreated and Ottoman rule was restored with British support in 1840. Shortly after, the Tanzimat reforms were implemented across the Ottoman Empire.

Since the existence of the earliest Jewish diaspora, many Jews have aspired to return to "Zion" and the "Land of Israel", though the amount of effort that should be spent towards such an aim was a matter of dispute. During the 16th century, Jewish communities struck roots in the Four Holy Cities—Jerusalem, Tiberias, Hebron, and Safed—and in 1697, Rabbi Yehuda Hachasid led a group of 1,500 Jews to Jerusalem. In the second half of the 18th century, Eastern European opponents of Hasidism, known as the Perushim, settled in Palestine.

The first wave of modern Jewish migration to Ottoman-ruled Palestine, known as the First Aliyah, began in 1881, as Jews fled pogroms in Eastern Europe. Although the Zionist movement already existed in practice, Austro-Hungarian journalist Theodor Herzl is credited with founding political Zionism, a movement that sought to establish a Jewish state in the Land of Israel, thus offering a solution to the so-called Jewish question of the European states, in conformity with the goals and achievements of other national projects of the time. In 1896, Herzl published Der Judenstaat (The Jewish State), offering his vision of a future Jewish state; the following year he presided over the First Zionist Congress in Basel, Switzerland. The Second Aliyah (1904–14) began after the Kishinev pogrom; some 40,000 Jews settled in Palestine, although nearly half of them left eventually. Both the first and second waves of migrants were mainly Orthodox Jews, although the Second Aliyah included socialist groups who established the kibbutz movement. Though the immigrants of the Second Aliyah largely sought to create communal agricultural settlements, the period also saw the establishment of Tel Aviv in 1909. This period also saw the emergence of Jewish armed militias, the first being Bar-Giora, a guard founded in 1907. Two years later, larger Hashomer organization was founded as its replacement.

British Mandate 

In 1917, during World War I, British Foreign Secretary Arthur Balfour sent the Balfour Declaration to Lord Rothschild, a leader of the British Jewish community, that stated that Britain intended for the creation of a Jewish "national home" in Palestine.

In 1918, the Jewish Legion, a group primarily of Zionist volunteers, assisted in the British conquest of Palestine. In 1920, after the Allies conquered the Levant during World War I, the territory was divided between Britain and France under the mandate system, and the British-administered area which included modern day Israel was named Mandatory Palestine. Arab opposition to British rule and Jewish immigration led to the 1920 Palestine riots and the formation of a Jewish militia known as the Haganah (meaning "The Defense" in Hebrew) as an outgrowth of Hashomer, from which the Irgun and Lehi paramilitaries later split off. In 1922, the League of Nations granted Britain the Mandate for Palestine under terms which included the Balfour Declaration with its promise to the Jews, and with similar provisions regarding the Arab Palestinians. The population of the area at this time was predominantly Arab and Muslim, with Jews accounting for about 11%, and Arab Christians about 9.5% of the population.

The Third (1919–23) and Fourth Aliyahs (1924–29) brought an additional 100,000 Jews to Palestine. The rise of Nazism and the increasing persecution of Jews in 1930s Europe led to the Fifth Aliyah, with an influx of a quarter of a million Jews. This was a major cause of the Arab revolt of 1936–39, which was launched as a reaction to continued Jewish immigration and land purchases. Several hundred Jews and British security personnel were killed, while the British Mandate authorities alongside the Zionist militias of the Haganah and Irgun killed 5,032 Arabs and wounded 14,760, resulting in over ten percent of the adult male Palestinian Arab population killed, wounded, imprisoned or exiled. The British introduced restrictions on Jewish immigration to Palestine with the White Paper of 1939. With countries around the world turning away Jewish refugees fleeing the Holocaust, a clandestine movement known as Aliyah Bet was organized to bring Jews to Palestine. By the end of World War II, the Jewish population of Palestine had increased to 31% of the total population.

After World War II, the UK found itself facing a Jewish guerrilla campaign over Jewish immigration restrictions, as well as continued conflict with the Arab community over limit levels. The Haganah joined Irgun and Lehi in an armed struggle against British rule. At the same time, hundreds of thousands of Jewish Holocaust survivors and refugees sought a new life far from their destroyed communities in Europe. The Haganah attempted to bring these refugees to Palestine in a programme called Aliyah Bet in which tens of thousands of Jewish refugees attempted to enter Palestine by ship. Most of the ships were intercepted by the Royal Navy and the refugees rounded up and placed in detention camps in Atlit and Cyprus by the British.

On 22 July 1946, Irgun bombed the British administrative headquarters for Palestine, which was housed in the southern wing of the King David Hotel in Jerusalem. A total of 91 people of various nationalities were killed and 46 were injured. The hotel was the site of the Secretariat of the Government of Palestine and the Headquarters of the British Armed Forces in Mandatory Palestine and Transjordan. The attack initially had the approval of the Haganah. It was conceived as a response to Operation Agatha (a series of widespread raids, including one on the Jewish Agency, conducted by the British authorities) and was the deadliest directed at the British during the Mandate era. The Jewish insurgency continued throughout the rest of 1946 and 1947 despite concerted efforts by the British military and Palestine Police Force to suppress it. British efforts to mediate a negotiated solution with Jewish and Arab representatives also failed as the Jews were unwilling to accept any solution that did not involve a Jewish state and suggested a partition of Palestine into Jewish and Arab states, while the Arabs were adamant that a Jewish state in any part of Palestine was unacceptable and that the only solution was a unified Palestine under Arab rule. In February 1947, the British referred the Palestine issue to the newly formed United Nations. On 15 May 1947, the General Assembly of the United Nations resolved that the United Nations Special Committee on Palestine be created "to prepare for consideration at the next regular session of the Assembly a report on the question of Palestine." In the Report of the Committee dated 3 September 1947 to the General Assembly, the majority of the Committee in Chapter VI proposed a plan to replace the British Mandate with "an independent Arab State, an independent Jewish State, and the City of Jerusalem [...] the last to be under an International Trusteeship System." Meanwhile, the Jewish insurgency continued and peaked in July 1947, with a series of widespread guerrilla raids culminating in the Sergeants affair, in which the Irgun took two British sergeants hostage as attempted leverage against the planned execution of three Irgun operatives. Irgun killed the officers after the executions were carried out.

In September 1947, the British cabinet decided that the Mandate was no longer tenable, and to evacuate Palestine. According to Colonial Secretary Arthur Creech Jones, four major factors led to the decision to evacuate Palestine: the inflexibility of Jewish and Arab negotiators who were unwilling to compromise on their core positions over the question of a Jewish state in Palestine, the economic pressure that stationing a large garrison in Palestine to deal with the Jewish insurgency and the possibility of a wider Jewish rebellion and the possibility of an Arab rebellion put on a British economy already strained by World War II, the "deadly blow to British patience and pride" caused by the hangings of the sergeants, and the mounting criticism the government faced in failing to find a new policy for Palestine in place of the White Paper of 1939.

On 29 November 1947, the General Assembly adopted Resolution 181 (II) recommending the adoption and implementation of the Plan of Partition with Economic Union. The plan attached to the resolution was essentially that proposed by the majority of the Committee in the report of 3 September. The Jewish Agency, which was the recognized representative of the Jewish community, accepted the plan, which assigned to Jews – a third of the population owning less than 7% of the land – 55–56% of Mandatory Palestine. The Arab League and Arab Higher Committee of Palestine rejected it, and indicated that they would reject any other plan of partition. On 1 December 1947, the Arab Higher Committee proclaimed a three-day strike, and riots broke out in Jerusalem. The situation spiraled into a civil war; just two weeks after the UN vote, Colonial Secretary Arthur Creech Jones announced that the British Mandate would end on 15 May 1948, at which point the British would evacuate. As Arab militias and gangs attacked Jewish areas, they were faced mainly by the Haganah, as well as the smaller Irgun and Lehi. In April 1948, the Haganah moved onto the offensive. During this period 250,000 Palestinian Arabs fled or were expelled, due to a number of factors.

Early years of the State of Israel

On 14 May 1948, the day before the expiration of the British Mandate, David Ben-Gurion, the head of the Jewish Agency, declared "the establishment of a Jewish state in Eretz-Israel, to be known as the State of Israel." The only reference in the text of the Declaration to the borders of the new state is the use of the term Eretz-Israel ("Land of Israel"). The following day, the armies of four Arab countries—Egypt, Syria, Transjordan and Iraq—entered into parts of what had been British Mandatory Palestine, launching the 1948 Arab–Israeli War; contingents from Yemen, Morocco, Saudi Arabia and Sudan joined the war. The apparent purpose of the invasion was to prevent the establishment of the Jewish state at inception, and some Arab leaders talked about "driving the Jews into the sea". According to Benny Morris, Jews were worried that the invading Arab armies held the intent to slaughter them. The Arab league stated the invasion was to restore law and order and to prevent further bloodshed.

After a year of fighting, a ceasefire was declared and temporary borders, known as the Green Line, were established. Jordan annexed what became known as the West Bank, including East Jerusalem, and Egypt occupied the Gaza Strip. The UN estimated that more than 700,000 Palestinians were expelled by or fled from advancing Israeli forces during the conflict—what would become known in Arabic as the Nakba ("catastrophe"). Some 156,000 remained and became Arab citizens of Israel.

Israel was admitted as a member of the UN by majority vote on 11 May 1949. An Israeli-Jordanian attempt at negotiating a peace agreement broke down after the British government, fearful of the Egyptian reaction to such a treaty, expressed their opposition to the Jordanian government. In the early years of the state, the Labor Zionist movement led by Prime Minister David Ben-Gurion dominated Israeli politics.

Immigration to Israel during the late 1940s and early 1950s was aided by the Israeli Immigration Department and the non-government sponsored Mossad LeAliyah Bet ( "Institute for Immigration B") which organized illegal and clandestine immigration. Both groups facilitated regular immigration logistics like arranging transportation, but the latter also engaged in clandestine operations in countries, particularly in the Middle East and Eastern Europe, where the lives of Jews were believed to be in danger and exit from those places was difficult. Mossad LeAliyah Bet was disbanded in 1953. The immigration was in accordance with the One Million Plan. The immigrants came for differing reasons: some held Zionist beliefs or came for the promise of a better life in Israel, while others moved to escape persecution or were expelled.

An influx of Holocaust survivors and Jews from Arab and Muslim countries to Israel during the first three years increased the number of Jews from 700,000 to 1,400,000. By 1958, the population of Israel rose to two million. Between 1948 and 1970, approximately 1,150,000 Jewish refugees relocated to Israel. Some new immigrants arrived as refugees with no possessions and were housed in temporary camps known as ma'abarot; by 1952, over 200,000 people were living in these tent cities. Jews of European background were often treated more favorably than Jews from Middle Eastern and North African countries—housing units reserved for the latter were often re-designated for the former, with the result that Jews newly arrived from Arab lands generally ended up staying in transit camps for longer. During this period, food, clothes and furniture had to be rationed in what became known as the austerity period. The need to solve the crisis led Ben-Gurion to sign a reparations agreement with West Germany that triggered mass protests by Jews angered at the idea that Israel could accept monetary compensation for the Holocaust.

During the 1950s, Israel was frequently attacked by Palestinian fedayeen, nearly always against civilians, mainly from the Egyptian-occupied Gaza Strip, leading to several Israeli reprisal operations. In 1956, the United Kingdom and France aimed at regaining control of the Suez Canal, which the Egyptians had nationalized. The continued blockade of the Suez Canal and Straits of Tiran to Israeli shipping, together with the growing amount of Fedayeen attacks against Israel's southern population, and recent Arab grave and threatening statements, prompted Israel to attack Egypt. Israel joined a secret alliance with the United Kingdom and France and overran the Sinai Peninsula but was pressured to withdraw by the UN in return for guarantees of Israeli shipping rights in the Red Sea via the Straits of Tiran and the Canal. The war, known as the Suez Crisis, resulted in significant reduction of Israeli border infiltration. In the early 1960s, Israel captured Nazi war criminal Adolf Eichmann in Argentina and brought him to Israel for trial. The trial had a major impact on public awareness of the Holocaust. Eichmann remains the only person executed in Israel by conviction in an Israeli civilian court. During the spring and summer of 1963 Israel was engaged in a diplomatic standoff with the United States due to the Israeli nuclear programme.

Since 1964, Arab countries, concerned over Israeli plans to divert waters of the Jordan River into the coastal plain, had been trying to divert the headwaters to deprive Israel of water resources, provoking tensions between Israel on the one hand, and Syria and Lebanon on the other. Arab nationalists led by Egyptian President Gamal Abdel Nasser refused to recognize Israel and called for its destruction. By 1966, Israeli-Arab relations had deteriorated to the point of actual battles taking place between Israeli and Arab forces. In May 1967, Egypt massed its army near the border with Israel, expelled UN peacekeepers, stationed in the Sinai Peninsula since 1957, and blocked Israel's access to the Red Sea. Other Arab states mobilized their forces. Israel reiterated that these actions were a casus belli and, on 5 June, launched a pre-emptive strike against Egypt. Jordan, Syria and Iraq responded and attacked Israel. In a Six-Day War, Israel captured and occupied the West Bank from Jordan, the Gaza Strip and Sinai Peninsula from Egypt, and the Golan Heights from Syria. Jerusalem's boundaries were enlarged, incorporating East Jerusalem, and the 1949 Green Line became the administrative boundary between Israel and the occupied territories.

Following the 1967 war and the "Three Nos" resolution of the Arab League, Israel faced attacks from the Egyptians in the Sinai Peninsula during the 1967–1970 War of Attrition, and from Palestinian groups targeting Israelis in the occupied territories, in Israel proper, and around the world. Most important among the various Palestinian and Arab groups was the Palestinian Liberation Organization (PLO), established in 1964, which initially committed itself to "armed struggle as the only way to liberate the homeland". In the late 1960s and early 1970s, Palestinian groups launched a wave of attacks against Israeli and Jewish targets around the world, including a massacre of Israeli athletes at the 1972 Summer Olympics in Munich. The Israeli government responded with an assassination campaign against the organizers of the massacre, a bombing and a raid on the PLO headquarters in Lebanon.

On 6 October 1973, as Jews were observing Yom Kippur, the Egyptian and Syrian armies launched a surprise attack against Israeli forces in the Sinai Peninsula and Golan Heights, that opened the Yom Kippur War. The war ended on 25 October with Israel successfully repelling Egyptian and Syrian forces but having suffered over 2,500 soldiers killed in a war which collectively took 10–35,000 lives in about 20 days. An internal inquiry exonerated the government of responsibility for failures before and during the war, but public anger forced Prime Minister Golda Meir to resign. In July 1976, an airliner was hijacked during its flight from Israel to France by Palestinian guerrillas and landed at Entebbe International Airport, Uganda. Israeli commandos carried out an operation in which 102 out of 106 Israeli hostages were successfully rescued.

Further conflict and peace process

The 1977 Knesset elections marked a major turning point in Israeli political history as Menachem Begin's Likud party took control from the Labor Party. Later that year, Egyptian President Anwar El Sadat made a trip to Israel and spoke before the Knesset in what was the first recognition of Israel by an Arab head of state. In the two years that followed, Sadat and Begin signed the Camp David Accords (1978) and the Egypt–Israel peace treaty (1979). In return, Israel withdrew from the Sinai Peninsula and agreed to enter negotiations over an autonomy for Palestinians in the West Bank and the Gaza Strip.

On 11 March 1978, a PLO guerilla raid from Lebanon led to the Coastal Road massacre. Israel responded by launching an invasion of southern Lebanon to destroy the PLO bases south of the Litani River. Most PLO fighters withdrew, but Israel was able to secure southern Lebanon until a UN force and the Lebanese army could take over. The PLO soon resumed its policy of attacks against Israel. In the next few years, the PLO infiltrated the south and kept up a sporadic shelling across the border. Israel carried out numerous retaliatory attacks by air and on the ground.

Meanwhile, Begin's government provided incentives for Israelis to settle in the occupied West Bank, increasing friction with the Palestinians in that area. The Basic Law: Jerusalem, Capital of Israel, passed in 1980, was believed by some to reaffirm Israel's 1967 annexation of Jerusalem by government decree, and reignited international controversy over the status of the city. No Israeli legislation has defined the territory of Israel and no act specifically included East Jerusalem therein. In 1981 Israel effectively annexed the Golan Heights, although annexation was not recognized internationally. The international community largely rejected these moves, with the UN Security Council declaring both the Jerusalem Law and the Golan Heights Law null and void. Israel's population diversity expanded in the 1980s and 1990s. Several waves of Ethiopian Jews immigrated to Israel since the 1980s, while between 1990 and 1994, immigration from the post-Soviet states increased Israel's population by twelve percent.

On 7 June 1981, during the Iran–Iraq War, the Israeli air force destroyed Iraq's sole nuclear reactor under construction just outside Baghdad, in order to impede Iraq's nuclear weapons programme. Following a series of PLO attacks in 1982, Israel invaded Lebanon that year to destroy the bases from which the PLO launched attacks and missiles into northern Israel. In the first six days of fighting, the Israelis destroyed the military forces of the PLO in Lebanon and decisively defeated the Syrians. An Israeli government inquiry—the Kahan Commission—would later hold Begin and several Israeli generals as indirectly responsible for the Sabra and Shatila massacre and hold Defense minister Ariel Sharon as bearing "personal responsibility" for the massacre. Sharon was forced to resign as Defense Minister. In 1985, Israel responded to a Palestinian terrorist attack in Cyprus by bombing the PLO headquarters in Tunisia. Israel withdrew from most of Lebanon in 1986, but maintained a borderland buffer zone in southern Lebanon until 2000, from where Israeli forces engaged in conflict with Hezbollah. The First Intifada, a Palestinian uprising against Israeli rule, broke out in 1987, with waves of uncoordinated demonstrations and violence occurring in the occupied West Bank and Gaza. Over the following six years, the Intifada became more organized and included economic and cultural measures aimed at disrupting the Israeli occupation. More than a thousand people were killed in the violence. During the 1991 Gulf War, the PLO supported Saddam Hussein and Iraqi Scud missile attacks against Israel. Despite public outrage, Israel heeded American calls to refrain from hitting back and did not participate in that war.

In 1992, Yitzhak Rabin became prime minister following an election in which his party called for compromise with Israel's neighbours. The following year, Shimon Peres on behalf of Israel, and Mahmoud Abbas for the PLO, signed the Oslo Accords, which gave the Palestinian National Authority the right to govern parts of the West Bank and the Gaza Strip. The PLO also recognized Israel's right to exist and pledged an end to terrorism. In 1994, the Israel–Jordan peace treaty was signed, making Jordan the second Arab country to normalize relations with Israel. Arab public support for the Accords was damaged by the continuation of Israeli settlements and checkpoints, and the deterioration of economic conditions. Israeli public support for the Accords waned as Israel was struck by Palestinian suicide attacks. In November 1995, Yitzhak Rabin was assassinated as he left a peace rally by Yigal Amir, a far-right Jew who opposed the Accords.

Under the leadership of Benjamin Netanyahu at the end of the 1990s, Israel withdrew from Hebron, and signed the Wye River Memorandum, giving greater control to the Palestinian National Authority. Ehud Barak, elected Prime Minister in 1999, began the new millennium by withdrawing forces from Southern Lebanon and conducting negotiations with Palestinian Authority Chairman Yasser Arafat and U.S. President Bill Clinton at the 2000 Camp David Summit. During the summit, Barak offered a plan for the establishment of a Palestinian state. The proposed state included the entirety of the Gaza Strip and over 90% of the West Bank with Jerusalem as a shared capital. Each side blamed the other for the failure of the talks. After a controversial visit by Likud leader Ariel Sharon to the Temple Mount, the Second Intifada began. Suicide bombings have been a recurring feature of the Intifada, causing Israeli civilian life to become a battlefield. Some commentators contend that the Intifada was pre-planned by Arafat due to the collapse of peace talks. Sharon became prime minister in a 2001 special election. During his tenure, Sharon carried out his plan to unilaterally withdraw from the Gaza Strip and also spearheaded the construction of the Israeli West Bank barrier, ending the Intifada. Between 2000 and 2008, 1,063 Israelis, 5,517 Palestinians and 64 foreign citizens had been killed.

In 2006, a Hezbollah artillery assault on Israel's northern border communities and a cross-border abduction of two Israeli soldiers precipitated the month-long Second Lebanon War. In 2007, the Israeli Air Force destroyed a nuclear reactor in Syria. In 2008, Israel entered another conflict as a ceasefire between Hamas and Israel collapsed. The 2008–2009 Gaza War lasted three weeks and ended after Israel announced a unilateral ceasefire. Hamas announced its own ceasefire, with its own conditions of complete withdrawal and opening of border crossings. Despite neither the rocket launchings nor Israeli retaliatory strikes having completely stopped, the fragile ceasefire remained in order. In what Israel described as a response to more than a hundred Palestinian rocket attacks on southern Israeli cities, Israel began an operation in the Gaza Strip in 2012, lasting eight days. Israel started another operation in Gaza following an escalation of rocket attacks by Hamas in July 2014. In May 2021, another round of fighting took place in Gaza and Israel, lasting eleven days.

By the 2010s, the increasing regional cooperation between Israel and Arab League countries have been established, culminating in the signing of the Abraham Accords. The Israeli security situation shifted from the traditional Arab–Israeli conflict towards the Iran–Israel proxy conflict and direct confrontation with Iran during the Syrian civil war.

Geography and environment

Israel is located in the Levant area of the Fertile Crescent region. The country is at the eastern end of the Mediterranean Sea, bounded by Lebanon to the north, Syria to the northeast, Jordan and the West Bank to the east, and Egypt and the Gaza Strip to the southwest. It lies between latitudes 29° and 34° N, and longitudes 34° and 36° E.

However Israel is so narrow (100 km at its widest, compared to 400 km from north to south) that the exclusive economic zone in the Mediterranean is double the land area of the country.

Despite its small size, Israel is home to a variety of geographic features, from the Negev desert in the south to the inland fertile Jezreel Valley, mountain ranges of the Galilee, Carmel and toward the Golan in the north. The Israeli coastal plain on the shores of the Mediterranean is home to most of the nation's population. East of the central highlands lies the Jordan Rift Valley, which forms a small part of the  Great Rift Valley. The Jordan River runs along the Jordan Rift Valley, from Mount Hermon through the Hulah Valley and the Sea of Galilee to the Dead Sea, the lowest point on the surface of the Earth. Further south is the Arabah, ending with the Gulf of Eilat, part of the Red Sea. Makhtesh, or "erosion cirques" are unique to the Negev and the Sinai Peninsula, the largest being the Makhtesh Ramon at 38 km in length. A report on the environmental status of the Mediterranean Basin states that Israel has the largest number of plant species per square meter of all the countries in the basin. Israel contains four terrestrial ecoregions: Eastern Mediterranean conifer-sclerophyllous-broadleaf forests, Southern Anatolian montane conifer and deciduous forests, Arabian Desert, and Mesopotamian shrub desert. It had a 2019 Forest Landscape Integrity Index mean score of 4.14/10, ranking it 135th globally out of 172 countries.

Tectonics and seismicity

The Jordan Rift Valley is the result of tectonic movements within the Dead Sea Transform (DSF) fault system. The DSF forms the transform boundary between the African Plate to the west and the Arabian Plate to the east. The Golan Heights and all of Jordan are part of the Arabian Plate, while the Galilee, West Bank, Coastal Plain, and Negev along with the Sinai Peninsula are on the African Plate. This tectonic disposition leads to a relatively high seismic activity in the region. The entire Jordan Valley segment is thought to have ruptured repeatedly, for instance during the last two major earthquakes along this structure in 749 and 1033. The deficit in slip that has built up since the 1033 event is sufficient to cause an earthquake of ~7.4.

The most catastrophic known earthquakes occurred in 31 BCE, 363, 749, and 1033 CE, that is every  400 years on average. Destructive earthquakes leading to serious loss of life strike about every 80 years. While stringent construction regulations are currently in place and recently built structures are earthquake-safe,  the majority of the buildings in Israel were older than these regulations and many public buildings as well as 50,000 residential buildings did not meet the new standards and were "expected to collapse" if exposed to a strong earthquake.

Climate

Temperatures in Israel vary widely, especially during the winter. Coastal areas, such as those of Tel Aviv and Haifa, have a typical Mediterranean climate with cool, rainy winters and long, hot summers. The area of Beersheba and the Northern Negev have a semi-arid climate with hot summers, cool winters, and fewer rainy days than the Mediterranean climate. The Southern Negev and the Arava areas have a desert climate with very hot, dry summers, and mild winters with few days of rain. The highest temperature in the world outside Africa and North America , 54 °C (129 °F), was recorded in 1942 in the Tirat Zvi kibbutz in the northern Jordan River valley.

From May to September, rain in Israel is rare. With scarce water resources, Israel has developed various water-saving technologies, including drip irrigation. Israelis also take advantage of the considerable sunlight available for solar energy, making Israel the leading nation in solar energy use per capita—practically every house uses solar panels for water heating.

There are four different phytogeographic regions in Israel, due to the country's location between the temperate and tropical zones, bordering the Mediterranean Sea in the west and the desert in the east. For this reason, the flora and fauna of Israel are extremely diverse. There are 2,867 known species of plants found in Israel. Of these, at least 253 species are introduced and non-native. There are 380 Israeli nature reserves.

The Israeli Ministry of Environmental Protection has reported that climate change "will have a decisive impact on all areas of life, including: water, public health, agriculture, energy, biodiversity, coastal infrastructure, economics, nature, national security, and geostrategy", and will have the greatest effect on vulnerable populations such as the poor, the elderly, and the chronically ill.

Demographics

, Israel's population was an estimated . In 2022, the civil government recorded 73.6% of the population as Jews, 21.1% of the population as Arabs, and 5.3% as non-Arab Christians and people who have no religion listed. Over the last decade, large numbers of migrant workers from Romania, Thailand, China, Africa, and South America have settled in Israel. Exact figures are unknown, as many of them are living in the country illegally, but estimates run from 166,000 to 203,000. By June 2012, approximately 60,000 African migrants had entered Israel. About 93% of Israelis live in urban areas. 90% of Palestinian Israelis reside in 139 densely populated towns and villages concentrated in the Galilee, Triangle and Negev regions, with the remaining 10% in mixed cities and neighbourhoods. Data published by the OECD in 2016 estimated the average life expectancy of Israelis at 82.5 years, making it the 6th-highest in the world. Israeli Arab life expectancy lags behind by 3 to 4 years, still highest among Arabs or Muslims in the world.

Israel was established as a homeland for the Jewish people and is often referred to as a Jewish state. The country's Law of Return grants all Jews and those of Jewish ancestry the right to Israeli citizenship. Retention of Israel's population since 1948 is about even or greater, when compared to other countries with mass immigration. Jewish emigration from Israel (called yerida in Hebrew), primarily to the United States and Canada, is described by demographers as modest, but is often cited by Israeli government ministries as a major threat to Israel's future.

Approximately 80% of Israeli Jews are born in Israel, 14% are immigrants from Europe and the Americas, and 6% are immigrants from Asia and Africa. Jews from Europe and the former Soviet Union and their descendants born in Israel, including Ashkenazi Jews, constitute approximately 50% of Jewish Israelis. Jews who left or fled Arab and Muslim countries and their descendants, including both Mizrahi and Sephardi Jews, form most of the rest of the Jewish population. Jewish intermarriage rates run at over 35% and recent studies suggest that the percentage of Israelis descended from both Sephardi and Ashkenazi Jews increases by 0.5 percent every year, with over 25% of school children now originating from both communities. Around 4% of Israelis (300,000), ethnically defined as "others", are Russian descendants of Jewish origin or family who are not Jewish according to rabbinical law, but were eligible for Israeli citizenship under the Law of Return.

The total number of Israeli settlers beyond the Green Line is over 600,000 (≈10% of the Jewish Israeli population). , 399,300 Israelis lived in West Bank settlements, including those that predated the establishment of the State of Israel and which were re-established after the Six-Day War, in cities such as Hebron and Gush Etzion bloc. In addition to the West Bank settlements, there were more than 200,000 Jews living in East Jerusalem, and 22,000 in the Golan Heights. Approximately 7,800 Israelis lived in settlements in the Gaza Strip, known as Gush Katif, until they were evacuated by the government as part of its 2005 disengagement plan.

Israeli Arabs (including the Arab population of East Jerusalem and the Golan Heights) comprise 21.1% of the population or 1,995,000 people. In a 2017 telephone poll, 40% of Arab citizens of Israel identified as "Arab in Israel" or "Arab citizen of Israel", 15% identified as "Palestinian", 8.9% as "Palestinian in Israel" or "Palestinian citizen of Israel", and 8.7% as "Arab"; 60% of Israeli Arabs have a positive view of the state. According to Sammy Smooha, "The identity of 83.0% of the Arabs in 2019 (up from 75.5% in 2017) has an Israeli component and 61.9% (unchanged from 60.3%) has a Palestinian component. However, when these two components were presented as competitors, 69.0% of the Arabs in 2019 chose exclusive or primary Palestinian identity, compared with 29.8% who chose exclusive or primary Israeli Arab identity."

Major urban areas

Israel has four major metropolitan areas: Gush Dan (Tel Aviv metropolitan area; population 3,854,000), Jerusalem metropolitan area (population 1,253,900), Haifa metropolitan area (population 924,400), and Beersheba metropolitan area (population 377,100).

Israeli government statistics on Jerusalem include the population and area of East Jerusalem, which is widely recognized as part of the Palestinian territories under Israeli occupation.
The (mainly Haredi) city of Bnei Brak is the most densely populated city in Israel and one of the 10 most densely populated cities in the world.

Israel has 16 cities with populations over 100,000. In all, there are 77 Israeli localities granted "municipalities" (or "city") status by the Ministry of the Interior, four of which are in the West Bank. Two more cities are planned: Kasif, a planned city to be built in the Negev, and Harish, originally a small town that is being built into a large city since 2015.

Language

Israel's sole official language is Hebrew. Until 2018, Arabic was also one of two official languages of the State of Israel; in 2018 it was downgraded to having a 'special status in the state' with its use by state institutions to be set in law. Hebrew is the primary language of the state and is spoken every day by the majority of the population. Arabic is spoken by the Arab minority, with Hebrew taught in Arab schools.

As a country of immigrants, many languages can be heard on the streets. Due to mass immigration from the former Soviet Union and Ethiopia (some 130,000 Ethiopian Jews live in Israel), Russian and Amharic are widely spoken. More than one million Russian-speaking immigrants arrived in Israel from the post-Soviet states between 1990 and 2004. French is spoken by around 700,000 Israelis, mostly originating from France and North Africa (see Maghrebi Jews). English was an official language during the Mandate period; it lost this status after the establishment of Israel, but retains a role comparable to that of an official language, as may be seen in road signs and official documents. Many Israelis communicate reasonably well in English, as many television programmes are broadcast in English with subtitles and the language is taught from the early grades in elementary school. In addition, Israeli universities offer courses in the English language on various subjects.

Religion

Israel comprises a major part of the Holy Land, a region of significant importance to all Abrahamic religions, including Judaism, Christianity, Islam, Samaritanism, the Druze Faith and the Baháʼí Faith.

The religious affiliation of Israeli Jews varies widely: a social survey from 2016 made by Pew Research indicates that 49% self-identify as Hiloni (secular), 29% as Masorti (traditional), 13% as Dati (religious) and 9% as Haredi (ultra-Orthodox). Haredi Jews are expected to represent more than 20% of Israel's Jewish population by 2028.

Muslims constitute Israel's largest religious minority, making up about 17.6% of the population. About 2% of the population is Christian and 1.6% is Druze. The Christian population is composed primarily of Arab Christians and Aramean Christians, but also includes post-Soviet immigrants, the foreign laborers of multinational origins, and followers of Messianic Judaism, considered by most Christians and Jews to be a form of Christianity. Members of many other religious groups, including Buddhists and Hindus, maintain a presence in Israel, albeit in small numbers. Out of more than one million immigrants from the former Soviet Union, about 300,000 are considered not Jewish by the Chief Rabbinate of Israel.

The city of Jerusalem is of special importance to Jews, Muslims, and Christians, as it is the home of sites that are pivotal to their religious beliefs, such as the Old City that incorporates the Western Wall and the Temple Mount (Al-Aqsa Mosque compound) and the Church of the Holy Sepulchre. Other locations of religious importance in Israel are Nazareth (holy in Christianity as the site of the Annunciation of Mary), Tiberias and Safed (two of the Four Holy Cities in Judaism), the White Mosque in Ramla (holy in Islam as the shrine of the prophet Saleh), and the Church of Saint George in Lod (holy in Christianity and Islam as the tomb of Saint George or Al Khidr). A number of other religious landmarks are located in the West Bank, among them Joseph's Tomb in Nablus, the birthplace of Jesus and Rachel's Tomb in Bethlehem, and the Cave of the Patriarchs in Hebron. The administrative center of the Baháʼí Faith and the Shrine of the Báb are located at the Baháʼí World Centre in Haifa; the leader of the faith is buried in Acre. A few kilometres south of the Baháʼí World Centre is Mahmood Mosque affiliated with the reformist Ahmadiyya movement. Kababir, Haifa's mixed neighbourhood of Jews and Ahmadi Arabs is one of a few of its kind in the country, others being Jaffa, Acre, other Haifa neighbourhoods, Harish and Upper Nazareth.

Education

Education is highly valued in the Israeli culture and was viewed as a fundamental block of ancient Israelites. Jewish communities in the Levant were the first to introduce compulsory education for which the organized community, not less than the parents was responsible. Many international business leaders such as Microsoft founder Bill Gates have praised Israel for its high quality of education in helping spur Israel's economic development and technological boom. In 2015, the country ranked third among OECD members (after Canada and Japan) for the percentage of 25–64 year-olds that have attained tertiary education with 49% compared with the OECD average of 35%. In 2012, the country ranked third in the world in the number of academic degrees per capita (20 percent of the population).

Israel has a school life expectancy of 16 years and a literacy rate of 97.8%. The State Education Law, passed in 1953, established five types of schools: state secular, state religious, ultra orthodox, communal settlement schools, and Arab schools. The public secular is the largest school group, and is attended by the majority of Jewish and non-Arab pupils in Israel. Most Arabs send their children to schools where Arabic is the language of instruction. Education is compulsory in Israel for children between the ages of three and eighteen. Schooling is divided into three tiers – primary school (grades 1–6), middle school (grades 7–9), and high school (grades 10–12) – culminating with Bagrut matriculation exams. Proficiency in core subjects such as mathematics, the Hebrew language, Hebrew and general literature, the English language, history, Biblical scripture and civics is necessary to receive a Bagrut certificate.

Israel's Jewish population maintains a relatively high level of educational attainment where just under half of all Israeli Jews (46%) hold post-secondary degrees. This figure has remained stable in their already high levels of educational attainment over recent generations. Israeli Jews (among those ages 25 and older) have average of 11.6 years of schooling making them one of the most highly educated of all major religious groups in the world. In Arab, Christian and Druze schools, the exam on Biblical studies is replaced by an exam on Muslim, Christian or Druze heritage. Maariv described the Christian Arabs sectors as "the most successful in education system", since Christians fared the best in terms of education in comparison to any other religion in Israel. Israeli children from Russian-speaking families have a higher bagrut pass rate at high-school level. Amongst immigrant children born in the former Soviet Union, the bagrut pass rate is higher amongst those families from European FSU states at 62.6% and lower amongst those from Central Asian and Caucasian FSU states. In 2014, 61.5% of all Israeli twelfth graders earned a matriculation certificate.

Israel has a tradition of higher education where its quality university education has been largely responsible in spurring the nation's modern economic development. Israel has nine public universities that are subsidized by the state and 49 private colleges. The Hebrew University of Jerusalem, Israel's second-oldest university after the Technion, houses the National Library of Israel, the world's largest repository of Judaica and Hebraica. The Technion and the Hebrew University consistently ranked among world's 100 top universities by the prestigious ARWU academic ranking. Other major universities in the country include the Weizmann Institute of Science, Tel Aviv University, Ben-Gurion University of the Negev, Bar-Ilan University, the University of Haifa and the Open University of Israel. Ariel University, in the West Bank, is the newest university institution, upgraded from college status, and the first in over thirty years.

Government and politics

Israel is a parliamentary democracy with universal suffrage. A member of parliament supported by a parliamentary majority becomes the prime minister—usually this is the chair of the largest party. The prime minister is the head of government and head of the cabinet.

Israel is governed by a 120-member parliament, known as the Knesset. Membership of the Knesset is based on proportional representation of political parties, with a 3.25% electoral threshold, which in practice has resulted in coalition governments. Residents of Israeli settlements in the West Bank are eligible to vote and after the 2015 election, 10 of the 120 MKs were settlers. Parliamentary elections are scheduled every four years, but unstable coalitions or a no-confidence vote by the Knesset can dissolve a government earlier. The first Arab-led party was established in 1988 and the main Arab bloc, the Joint List, holds about 10% of the parliament's seats.

The Basic Laws of Israel function as an uncodified constitution. In its Basic Laws, Israel defines itself as a Jewish and democratic state, and as the nation-state of the Jewish people. In 2003, the Knesset began to draft an official constitution based on these laws.

The president of Israel is head of state, with limited and largely ceremonial duties.

Israel has no official religion, but the definition of the state as "Jewish and democratic" creates a strong connection with Judaism, as well as a conflict between state law and religious law. Interaction between the political parties keeps the balance between state and religion largely as it existed during the British Mandate.

On 19 July 2018, the Knesset passed a Basic Law that characterizes the State of Israel as principally a "Nation State of the Jewish People", and Hebrew as its official language. The bill ascribes "special status" to the Arabic language. The same bill gives Jews a unique right to national self-determination, and views the developing of Jewish settlement in the country as "a national interest", empowering the government to "take steps to encourage, advance and implement this interest."

Legal system

Israel has a three-tier court system. At the lowest level are magistrate courts, situated in most cities across the country. Above them are district courts, serving as both appellate courts and courts of first instance; they are situated in five of Israel's six districts. The third and highest tier is the Supreme Court, located in Jerusalem; it serves a dual role as the highest court of appeals and the High Court of Justice. In the latter role, the Supreme Court rules as a court of first instance, allowing individuals, both citizens and non-citizens, to petition against the decisions of state authorities. Although Israel supports the goals of the International Criminal Court, it has not ratified the Rome Statute, citing concerns about the ability of the court to remain free from political impartiality.

Israel's legal system combines three legal traditions: English common law, civil law, and Jewish law. It is based on the principle of stare decisis (precedent) and is an adversarial system, where the parties in the suit bring evidence before the court. Court cases are decided by professional judges with no role for juries. Marriage and divorce are under the jurisdiction of the religious courts: Jewish, Muslim, Druze, and Christian. The election of judges is carried out by a committee of two Knesset members, three Supreme Court justices, two Israeli Bar members and two ministers (one of which, Israel's justice minister, is the committee's chairman). The committee's members of the Knesset are secretly elected by the Knesset, and one of them is traditionally a member of the opposition, the committee's Supreme Court justices are chosen by tradition from all Supreme Court justices by seniority, the Israeli Bar members are elected by the bar, and the second minister is appointed by the Israeli cabinet. The current justice minister and committee's chairman is Yariv Levin. Administration of Israel's courts (both the "General" courts and the Labor Courts) is carried by the Administration of Courts, situated in Jerusalem. Both General and Labor courts are paperless courts: the storage of court files, as well as court decisions, are conducted electronically. Israel's Basic Law: Human Dignity and Liberty seeks to defend human rights and liberties in Israel. As a result of "Enclave law", large portions of Israeli civil law are applied to Israeli settlements and Israeli residents in the occupied territories.

Administrative divisions

The State of Israel is divided into six main administrative districts, known as mehozot (singular: mahoz) – Center, Haifa, Jerusalem, North, South, and Tel Aviv districts, as well as the Judea and Samaria Area in the West Bank. All of the Judea and Samaria Area and parts of the Jerusalem and Northern districts are not recognized internationally as part of Israel. Districts are further divided into fifteen sub-districts known as nafot (singular: nafa), which are themselves partitioned into fifty natural regions.

 Including 361,700 Arabs and 233,900 Jews in East Jerusalem, .
 Israeli citizens only.

Israeli-occupied territories

In 1967, as a result of the Six-Day War, Israel captured and occupied the West Bank, including East Jerusalem, the Gaza Strip and the Golan Heights. Israel also captured the Sinai Peninsula, but returned it to Egypt as part of the 1979 Egypt–Israel peace treaty. Between 1982 and 2000, Israel occupied part of southern Lebanon, in what was known as the Security Belt. Since Israel's capture of these territories, Israeli settlements and military installations have been built within each of them, except Lebanon.

The Golan Heights and East Jerusalem have been fully incorporated into Israel under Israeli law, but not under international law. Israel has applied civilian law to both areas and granted their inhabitants permanent residency status and the ability to apply for citizenship. The UN Security Council has declared the annexation of the Golan Heights and East Jerusalem to be "null and void" and continues to view the territories as occupied. The status of East Jerusalem in any future peace settlement has at times been a difficult issue in negotiations between Israeli governments and representatives of the Palestinians, as Israel views it as its sovereign territory, as well as part of its capital.

The West Bank excluding East Jerusalem is known in Israeli law as the Judea and Samaria Area; the almost 400,000 Israeli settlers residing in the area are considered part of Israel's population, have Knesset representation, a large part of Israel's civil and criminal laws applied to them, and their output is considered part of Israel's economy. The land itself is not considered part of Israel under Israeli law, as Israel has consciously refrained from annexing the territory, without ever relinquishing its legal claim to the land or defining a border with the area. There is no border between Israel-proper and the West Bank for Israeli vehicles. Israeli political opposition to annexation is primarily due to the perceived "demographic threat" of incorporating the West Bank's Palestinian population into Israel. Outside of the Israeli settlements, the West Bank remains under direct Israeli military rule, and Palestinians in the area cannot become Israeli citizens. The international community maintains that Israel does not have sovereignty in the West Bank, and considers Israel's control of the area to be the longest military occupation is modern history. The West Bank was occupied and annexed by Jordan in 1950, following the 1949 Armistice Agreements. Only Britain recognized this annexation and Jordan has since ceded its claim to the territory to the PLO. The population are mainly Palestinians, including refugees of the 1948 Arab–Israeli War. From their occupation in 1967 until 1993, the Palestinians living in these territories were under Israeli military administration. Since the Israel–PLO letters of recognition, most of the Palestinian population and cities have been under the internal jurisdiction of the Palestinian Authority, and only partial Israeli military control, although Israel has on several occasions redeployed its troops and reinstated full military administration during periods of unrest. In response to increasing attacks during the Second Intifada, the Israeli government started to construct the Israeli West Bank barrier. When completed, approximately 13% of the barrier will be constructed on the Green Line or in Israel with 87% inside the West Bank.

The Gaza Strip is considered to be a "foreign territory" under Israeli law; however, since Israel operates a land, air, and sea blockade of the Gaza Strip, together with Egypt, the international community considers Israel to be the occupying power. The Gaza Strip was occupied by Egypt from 1948 to 1967 and then by Israel after 1967. In 2005, as part of Israel's unilateral disengagement plan, Israel removed all of its settlers and forces from the territory, however, it continues to maintain control of its airspace and waters. The international community, including numerous international humanitarian organizations and various bodies of the UN, consider Gaza to remain occupied. Following the 2007 Battle of Gaza, when Hamas assumed power in the Gaza Strip, Israel tightened its control of the Gaza crossings along its border, as well as by sea and air, and prevented persons from entering and exiting the area except for isolated cases it deemed humanitarian. Gaza has a border with Egypt, and an agreement between Israel, the European Union, and the PA governed how border crossing would take place (it was monitored by European observers). The application of democracy to its Palestinian citizens, and the selective application of Israeli democracy in the Israeli-controlled Palestinian territories, has been criticized.

The International Court of Justice, principal judicial organ of the UN, asserted, in its 2004 advisory opinion on the legality of the construction of the Israeli West Bank barrier, that the lands captured by Israel in the Six-Day War, including East Jerusalem, are occupied territory. Most negotiations relating to the territories have been on the basis of UN Security Council Resolution 242, which emphasizes "the inadmissibility of the acquisition of territory by war", and calls on Israel to withdraw from occupied territories in return for normalization of relations with Arab states, a principle known as "Land for peace". Israel has been criticized for engaging in systematic and widespread violations of human rights in the occupied territories, including the occupation itself, and war crimes against civilians. The allegations include violations of international humanitarian law by the UN Human Rights Council, The U.S. State Department has called reports of abuses of significant human rights of Palestinians 'credible' both within Israel and the occupied territories. Amnesty International and other NGOs have documented mass arbitrary arrests, torture, unlawful killings, systemic abuses and impunity in tandem with a denial of the right to Palestinian self-determination. In response to such allegations, Prime Minister Netanyahu has defended the country's security forces for protecting the innocent from terrorists and expressed contempt for what he describes as a lack of concern about the human rights violations committed by "criminal killers". Some observers, such as Israeli officials, scholars, United States Ambassador to the UN Nikki Haley and UN secretary-generals Ban Ki-moon and Kofi Annan, also assert that the UN is disproportionately concerned with Israeli misconduct.

The international community widely regards Israeli settlements in the occupied territories illegal under international law. United Nations Security Council Resolution 2334, passed on 23 December 2016 in a 14–0 vote by members of the U.N. Security Council (UNSC) with the United States abstaining. The resolution states that Israel's settlement activity constitutes a "flagrant violation" of international law, has "no legal validity" and demands that Israel stop such activity and fulfill its obligations as an occupying power under the Fourth Geneva Convention.

Israel's treatment of the Palestinians within the occupied territories has drawn accusations that it is guilty of the crime of apartheid by Israeli human rights groups Yesh Din and B'tselem, and other international organizations including Amnesty International and Human Rights Watch, with the criticism extending to its treatment of Palestinians within Israel as well. Amnesty's report was criticized by politicians and government representatives from Israel, the United States, the United Kingdom, Netherlands and Germany, while it was welcomed by Palestinians, representatives from other states, and organizations such as the Arab League. A 2021 survey of academic experts on the Middle East found an increase from 59% to 65% of these scholars describing Israel as a "one-state reality akin to apartheid". In 2022, Michael Lynk, a Canadian law professor appointed by the U.N. Human Rights Council said that the situation met the legal definition of apartheid. Subsequent reports from his successor, Francesca Albanese and from  Permanent United Nations Fact Finding Mission on the Israel Palestine conflict chair Navi Pillay echoed this opinion.

Foreign relations

Israel maintains diplomatic relations , as well as with the Holy See, Kosovo, the Cook Islands and Niue. It has 107 diplomatic missions around the world; countries with whom they have no diplomatic relations include most Muslim countries. Six out of twenty-two nations in the Arab League have normalized relations with Israel. Egypt and Jordan signed peace treaties in 1979 and 1994, respectively, but Israel remains formally in a state of war with Syria, a status that dates back uninterrupted to 1948. It has been in a similarly formal state of war with Lebanon since the end of the Lebanese Civil War in 2000, with the Israel–Lebanon border remaining unagreed by treaty.

In late 2020, Israel normalized relations with four more Arab countries: the United Arab Emirates and Bahrain in September (known as the Abraham Accords), Sudan in October, and Morocco in December. Despite the peace treaty between Israel and Egypt, Israel is still widely considered an enemy country among Egyptians. Iran had diplomatic relations with Israel under the Pahlavi dynasty but withdrew its recognition of Israel during the Islamic Revolution. Israeli citizens may not visit Syria, Lebanon, Iraq, Saudi Arabia, and Yemen (countries Israel fought in the 1948 Arab–Israeli War that Israel does not have a peace treaty with) without permission from the Ministry of the Interior. As a result of the 2008–09 Gaza War, Mauritania, Qatar, Bolivia, and Venezuela suspended political and economic ties with Israel, though Bolivia renewed ties in 2019. China maintains good ties with both Israel and the Arab world.

The United States and the Soviet Union were the first two countries to recognize the State of Israel, having declared recognition roughly simultaneously. Diplomatic relations with the Soviet Union were broken in 1967, following the Six-Day War, and renewed in October 1991. The United States regards Israel as its "most reliable partner in the Middle East", based on "common democratic values, religious affinities, and security interests". The United States has provided $68 billion in military assistance and $32 billion in grants to Israel since 1967, under the Foreign Assistance Act (period beginning 1962), more than any other country for that period until 2003. Most surveyed Americans have also held consistently favorable views of Israel. The United Kingdom is seen as having a "natural" relationship with Israel on account of the Mandate for Palestine. Relations between the two countries were also made stronger by former prime minister Tony Blair's efforts for a two state resolution. , Germany had paid 25 billion euros in reparations to the Israeli state and individual Israeli Holocaust survivors. Israel is included in the European Union's European Neighbourhood Policy (ENP), which aims at bringing the EU and its neighbours closer.

Although Turkey and Israel did not establish full diplomatic relations until 1991, Turkey has cooperated with the Jewish state since its recognition of Israel in 1949. Turkey's ties to other Muslim-majority nations in the region have at times resulted in pressure from Arab and Muslim states to temper its relationship with Israel. Relations between Turkey and Israel took a downturn after the 2008–09 Gaza War and Israel's raid of the Gaza flotilla. Relations between Greece and Israel have improved since 1995 due to the decline of Israeli–Turkish relations. The two countries have a defense cooperation agreement and in 2010, the Israeli Air Force hosted Greece's Hellenic Air Force in a joint exercise at the Uvda base. The joint Cyprus-Israel oil and gas explorations centered on the Leviathan gas field are an important factor for Greece, given its strong links with Cyprus. Cooperation in the world's longest subsea electric power cable, the EuroAsia Interconnector, has strengthened relations between Cyprus and Israel.

Azerbaijan is one of the few majority Muslim countries to develop strategic and economic relations with Israel. Azerbaijan supplies the country with a substantial amount of its oil needs, and Israel is a critical arms supplier for Azerbaijan. Kazakhstan also has an economic and strategic partnership with Israel. India established full diplomatic ties with Israel in 1992 and has fostered a strong military, technological and cultural partnership with the country since then. A 2009 survey done on behalf of the Israel Ministry of Foreign Affairs listed India as more pro-Israel than 12 other countries surveyed. India is the largest customer of the Israeli military equipment and Israel is the second-largest military partner of India after Russia. Ethiopia is Israel's main ally in Africa due to common political, religious and security interests. Israel provides expertise to Ethiopia on irrigation projects and thousands of Ethiopian Jews live in Israel.

Israel has a history of providing emergency foreign aid and humanitarian response teams to disasters across the world. In 1955 Israel began its foreign aid programme in Burma. The programme's focus subsequently shifted to Africa. Israel's humanitarian efforts officially began in 1957, with the establishment of Mashav, the Israel's Agency for International Development Cooperation. In this early period, whilst Israel's aid represented only a small percentage of total aid to Africa, its programme was effective in creating goodwill throughout the continent; however, following the 1967 war relations soured. Israel's foreign aid programme subsequently shifted its focus to Latin America. Since the late 1970s Israel's foreign aid has gradually decreased, although in recent years Israel has tried to reestablish its aid to Africa. There are additional Israeli humanitarian and emergency response groups that work with the Israel government, including IsraAid, a joint programme run by 14 Israeli organizations and North American Jewish groups, ZAKA, The Fast Israeli Rescue and Search Team (FIRST), Israeli Flying Aid (IFA), Save a Child's Heart (SACH) and Latet. Between 1985 and 2015, Israel sent 24 delegations of IDF search and rescue unit, the Home Front Command, to 22 countries. Currently Israeli foreign aid ranks low among OECD nations, spending less than 0.1% of its GNI on development assistance. The UN has set a target of 0.7%. In 2015 six nations reached the UN target. The country ranked 38th in the 2018 World Giving Index.

Military

The Israel Defense Forces (IDF) is the sole military wing of the Israeli security forces, and is headed by its Chief of General Staff, the Ramatkal, subordinate to the Cabinet. The IDF consists of the army, air force and navy. It was founded during the 1948 Arab–Israeli War by consolidating paramilitary organizations—chiefly the Haganah—that preceded the establishment of the state. The IDF also draws upon the resources of the Military Intelligence Directorate (Aman), which works with Mossad and Shabak. The Israel Defense Forces have been involved in several major wars and border conflicts in its short history, making it one of the most battle-trained armed forces in the world.

Most Israelis are drafted into the military at the age of 18. Men serve two years and eight months and women two years. Following mandatory service, Israeli men join the reserve forces and usually do up to several weeks of reserve duty every year until their forties. Most women are exempt from reserve duty. Arab citizens of Israel (except the Druze) and those engaged in full-time religious studies are exempt from military service, although the exemption of yeshiva students has been a source of contention in Israeli society for many years. An alternative for those who receive exemptions on various grounds is Sherut Leumi, or national service, which involves a programme of service in hospitals, schools and other social welfare frameworks. A small minority of Israeli Arabs also volunteer to serve in the army. As a result of its conscription programme, the IDF maintains approximately 176,500 active troops and an additional 465,000 reservists, giving Israel one of the world's highest percentage of citizens with military training.

The nation's military relies heavily on high-tech weapons systems designed and manufactured in Israel as well as some foreign imports. The Arrow missile is one of the world's few operational anti-ballistic missile systems. The Python air-to-air missile series is often considered one of the most crucial weapons in its military history. Israel's Spike missile is one of the most widely exported anti-tank guided missiles (ATGMs) in the world. Israel's Iron Dome anti-missile air defense system gained worldwide acclaim after intercepting hundreds of Qassam, 122 mm Grad and Fajr-5 artillery rockets fire by Palestinian militants from the Gaza Strip. Since the Yom Kippur War, Israel has developed a network of reconnaissance satellites. The success of the Ofeq programme has made Israel one of seven countries capable of launching such satellites.

Israel is widely believed to possess nuclear weapons and per a 1993 report, chemical and biological weapons of mass destruction. Israel has not signed the Treaty on the Non-Proliferation of Nuclear Weapons and maintains a policy of deliberate ambiguity toward its nuclear capabilities. The Israeli Navy's Dolphin submarines are believed to be armed with nuclear Popeye Turbo missiles, offering second-strike capability. Since the Gulf War in 1991, when Israel was attacked by Iraqi Scud missiles, all homes in Israel are required to have a reinforced security room, Merkhav Mugan, impermeable to chemical and biological substances.

Since Israel's establishment, military expenditure constituted a significant portion of the country's gross domestic product, with peak of 30.3% of GDP spent on defense in 1975. In 2021, Israel ranked 15th in the world by total military expenditure, with $24.3 billion, and 6th by defense spending as a percentage of GDP, with 5.2%. Since 1974, the United States has been a particularly notable contributor of military aid to Israel. Under a memorandum of understanding signed in 2016, the U.S. is expected to provide the country with $3.8 billion per year, or around 20% of Israel's defense budget, from 2018 to 2028. Israel ranked 8th globally for arms exports in 2021. The majority of Israel's arms exports are unreported for security reasons. Israel is consistently rated low in the Global Peace Index, ranking 134th out of 163 nations for peacefulness in 2022.

Economy

Israel is considered the most advanced country in Western Asia and the Middle East in economic and industrial development. In recent years Israel has had the highest growth rate in the Western world along with Ireland. In 2023, the IMF estimated Israel's GDP at 564 billion dollars and Israel's GDP per capita at 58,270, a figure comparable to other highly developed and rich countries. Israel has the highest average wealth per adult in the Middle East. The Economist ranked Israel as the 4th most successful economy among the developed countries for 2022. Israel's quality university education and the establishment of a highly motivated and educated populace is largely responsible for spurring the country's high technology boom and rapid economic development. In 2010, it joined the OECD. The country is ranked 20th in the World Economic Forum's Global Competitiveness Report and 35th on the World Bank's Ease of Doing Business index. Israel was also ranked fifth in the world by share of people in high-skilled employment. Israeli economic data covers the economic territory of Israel, including the Golan Heights, East Jerusalem and Israeli settlements in the West Bank.

Despite limited natural resources, intensive development of the agricultural and industrial sectors over the past decades has made Israel largely self-sufficient in food production, apart from grains and beef. Imports to Israel, totaling $96.5 billion in 2020, include raw materials, military equipment, investment goods, rough diamonds, fuels, grain, and consumer goods. Leading exports include machinery and equipment, software, cut diamonds, agricultural products, chemicals, and textiles and apparel; in 2020, Israeli exports reached $114 billion. The Bank of Israel holds $201 billion of foreign-exchange reserves, the 17th highest in the world. Since the 1970s, Israel has received military aid from the United States, as well as economic assistance in the form of loan guarantees, which now account for roughly half of Israel's external debt. Israel has one of the lowest external debts in the developed world, and is a lender in terms of net external debt (assets vs. liabilities abroad), which  stood at a surplus of $69 billion.

Israel has the second-largest number of startup companies in the world after the United States, and the third-largest number of NASDAQ-listed companies after the U.S. and China. It is the world leader for number of start-ups per capita. Intel and Microsoft built their first overseas research and development facilities in Israel, and other high-tech multi-national corporations, such as IBM, Google, Apple, Hewlett-Packard, Cisco Systems, Facebook and Motorola have opened research and development centres in the country. In 2007, American investor Warren Buffett's holding company Berkshire Hathaway bought the Israeli company Iscar for $4 billion, its first acquisition outside the United States.

The days which are allocated to working times in Israel are Sunday through Thursday (for a five-day workweek), or Friday (for a six-day workweek). In observance of Shabbat, in places where Friday is a work day and the majority of population is Jewish, Friday is a "short day", usually lasting until 14:00 in the winter, or 16:00 in the summer. Several proposals have been raised to adjust the work week with the majority of the world, and make Sunday a non-working day, while extending working time of other days or replacing Friday with Sunday as a work day.

Science and technology

Israel's development of cutting-edge technologies in software, communications and the life sciences have evoked comparisons with Silicon Valley. Israel is first in the world in expenditure on research and development as a percentage of GDP. It is ranked sixteenth in the Global Innovation Index in 2022, down from tenth in 2019 and fifth in the 2019 Bloomberg Innovation Index. Israel has 140 scientists, technicians, and engineers per 10,000 employees, the highest number in the world, for comparison the U.S. has 85 per 100,000. Israel has produced six Nobel Prize-winning scientists since 2004 and has been frequently ranked as one of the countries with the highest ratios of scientific papers per capita in the world. Israel has led the world in stem-cell research papers per capita since 2000. Israeli universities are ranked among the top 50 world universities in computer science (Technion and Tel Aviv University), mathematics (Hebrew University of Jerusalem) and chemistry (Weizmann Institute of Science).

In 2012, Israel was ranked ninth in the world by the Futron's Space Competitiveness Index. The Israel Space Agency coordinates all Israeli space research programmes with scientific and commercial goals, and have indigenously designed and built at least 13 commercial, research and spy satellites. Some of Israel's satellites are ranked among the world's most advanced space systems. Shavit is a space launch vehicle produced by Israel to launch small satellites into low Earth orbit. It was first launched in 1988, making Israel the eighth nation to have a space launch capability. In 2003, Ilan Ramon became Israel's first astronaut, serving as payload specialist of STS-107, the fatal mission of the Space Shuttle Columbia.

The ongoing shortage of water in the country has spurred innovation in water conservation techniques, and a substantial agricultural modernization, drip irrigation, was invented in Israel. Israel is also at the technological forefront of desalination and water recycling. The Sorek desalination plant is the largest seawater reverse osmosis (SWRO) desalination facility in the world. By 2014, Israel's desalination programmes provided roughly 35% of Israel's drinking water and it is expected to supply 40% by 2015 and 70% by 2050. , more than 50 percent of the water for Israeli households, agriculture and industry is artificially produced. The country hosts an annual Water Technology and Environmental Control Exhibition & Conference (WATEC) that attracts thousands of people from across the world. In 2011, Israel's water technology industry was worth around $2 billion a year with annual exports of products and services in the tens of millions of dollars. As a result of innovations in reverse osmosis technology, Israel is set to become a net exporter of water in the coming years.

Israel has embraced solar energy; its engineers are on the cutting edge of solar energy technology and its solar companies work on projects around the world. Over 90% of Israeli homes use solar energy for hot water, the highest per capita in the world. According to government figures, the country saves 8% of its electricity consumption per year because of its solar energy use in heating. The high annual incident solar irradiance at its geographic latitude creates ideal conditions for what is an internationally renowned solar research and development industry in the Negev Desert. Israel had a modern electric car infrastructure involving a countrywide network of charging stations to facilitate the charging and exchange of car batteries. It was thought that this would have lowered Israel's oil dependency and lowered the fuel costs of hundreds of Israel's motorists that use cars powered only by electric batteries. The Israeli model was being studied by several countries and being implemented in Denmark and Australia. However, Israel's trailblazing electric car company Better Place shut down in 2013.

Energy

Israel began producing natural gas from its own offshore gas fields in 2004. Between 2005 and 2012, Israel had imported gas from Egypt via the al-Arish–Ashkelon pipeline, which was terminated due to Egyptian Crisis of 2011–14. In 2009, a natural gas reserve, Tamar, was found near the coast of Israel. A second natural gas reserve, Leviathan, was discovered in 2010. The natural gas reserves in these two fields (Leviathan has around 19 trillion cubic feet) could make Israel energy secure for more than 50 years. In 2013, Israel began commercial production of natural gas from the Tamar field. , Israel produced over 7.5 billion cubic meters (bcm) of natural gas a year. Israel had 199 billion cubic meters (bcm) of proven reserves of natural gas as of the start of 2016. The Leviathan gas field started production in 2019.

Ketura Sun is Israel's first commercial solar field. Built in early 2011 by the Arava Power Company on Kibbutz Ketura, Ketura Sun covers twenty acres and is expected to produce green energy amounting to 4.95 megawatts (MW). The field consists of 18,500 photovoltaic panels made by Suntech, which will produce about 9 gigawatt-hours (GWh) of electricity per year. In the next twenty years, the field will spare the production of some 125,000 metric tons of carbon dioxide. The field was inaugurated on 15 June 2011. On 22 May 2012 Arava Power Company announced that it had reached financial close on an additional 58.5 MW for 8 projects to be built in the Arava and the Negev valued at 780 million NIS or approximately $204 million.

Transport

Israel has a modern transport system. The country has  of paved roads, and 3 million motor vehicles. The number of motor vehicles per 1,000 persons is 365, relatively low with respect to developed countries. Israel has 5,715 buses on scheduled routes, operated by several carriers, the largest and oldest of which is Egged, serving most of the country. Railways stretch across  and are operated solely by government-owned Israel Railways. Following major investments beginning in the early to mid-1990s, the number of train passengers per year has grown from 2.5 million in 1990, to 53 million in 2015; railways are also transporting 7.5 million tons of cargo, per year.

Israel is served by two international airports, Ben Gurion Airport, the country's main hub for international air travel near Tel Aviv, and Ramon Airport, which serves the southernmost port city of Eilat. Ben Gurion, Israel's largest airport, handled over 15 million passengers in 2015. The country has three main ports: the Port of Haifa, the country's oldest and largest, on the Mediterranean coast, Ashdod Port; and the smaller Port of Eilat on the Red Sea.

Tourism

Tourism, especially religious tourism, is an important industry in Israel, with the country's temperate climate, beaches, archaeological, other historical and biblical sites, and unique geography also drawing tourists. Israel's security problems have taken their toll on the industry, but the number of incoming tourists is on the rebound. In 2017, a record of 3.6 million tourists visited Israel, yielding a 25 percent growth since 2016 and contributed NIS 20 billion to the Israeli economy.

Real estate

Housing prices in Israel are listed in the top third, with an average of 150 salaries required to buy an apartment. As of 2022, there are about 2.7 million properties in Israel, with an annual increase of more than 50,000. However, the demand for housing exceeds supply, with a shortage of about 200,000 apartments as of 2021, and thus rising house prices. As a result, by 2021 housing prices rose by 5.6%. High prices do not stop Israelis from buying properties. In 2021, Israelis took a record of NIS 116.1 billion in mortgages, an increase of 50% from 2020.

Culture

Israel's diverse culture stems from the diversity of its population. Jews from diaspora communities around the world brought their cultural and religious traditions back with them, creating a melting pot of Jewish customs and beliefs. Arab influences are present in many cultural spheres, such as architecture, music, and cuisine. Israel is the only country in the world where life revolves around the Hebrew calendar. Work and school holidays are determined by the Jewish holidays, and the official day of rest is Saturday, the Jewish Sabbath.

Literature

Israeli literature is primarily poetry and prose written in Hebrew, as part of the renaissance of Hebrew as a spoken language since the mid-19th century, although a small body of literature is published in other languages, such as English. By law, two copies of all printed matter published in Israel must be deposited in the National Library of Israel at the Hebrew University of Jerusalem. In 2001, the law was amended to include audio and video recordings, and other non-print media. In 2016, 89 percent of the 7,300 books transferred to the library were in Hebrew.

In 1966, Shmuel Yosef Agnon shared the Nobel Prize in Literature with German Jewish author Nelly Sachs. Leading Israeli poets have been Yehuda Amichai, Nathan Alterman, Leah Goldberg, and Rachel Bluwstein. Internationally famous contemporary Israeli novelists include Amos Oz, Etgar Keret and David Grossman. The Israeli-Arab satirist Sayed Kashua (who writes in Hebrew) is also internationally known. Israel has also been the home of Emile Habibi, whose novel The Secret Life of Saeed: The Pessoptimist, and other writings, won him the Israel prize for Arabic literature.

Music and dance

Israeli music contains musical influences from all over the world; Mizrahi and Sephardic music, Hasidic melodies, Greek music, jazz, and pop rock are all part of the music scene. Among Israel's world-renowned orchestras is the Israel Philharmonic Orchestra, which has been in operation for over seventy years and today performs more than two hundred concerts each year. Itzhak Perlman, Pinchas Zukerman and Ofra Haza are among the internationally acclaimed musicians born in Israel. Israel has participated in the Eurovision Song Contest nearly every year since 1973, winning the competition four times and hosting it twice. Eilat has hosted its own international music festival, the Red Sea Jazz Festival, every summer since 1987. The nation's canonical folk songs, known as "Songs of the Land of Israel," deal with the experiences of the pioneers in building the Jewish homeland.

Cinema and theatre

Ten Israeli films have been final nominees for Best Foreign Language Film at the Academy Awards since the establishment of Israel. The 2009 movie Ajami was the third consecutive nomination of an Israeli film. Palestinian Israeli filmmakers have made a number of films dealing with the Arab-Israeli conflict and the status of Palestinians within Israel, such as Mohammed Bakri's 2002 film Jenin, Jenin and The Syrian Bride.

Continuing the strong theatrical traditions of the Yiddish theatre in Eastern Europe, Israel maintains a vibrant theatre scene. Founded in 1918, Habima Theatre in Tel Aviv is Israel's oldest repertory theater company and national theater.

Media

The 2017 Freedom of the Press annual report by Freedom House ranked Israel as the Middle East and North Africa's most free country, and 64th globally. In the 2017 Press Freedom Index by Reporters Without Borders, Israel (including "Israel extraterritorial" since 2013 ranking) was placed 91st of 180 countries, first in the Middle East and North Africa region. Reporters Without Borders noted that "Palestinian journalists are systematically subjected to violence as a result of their coverage of events in the West Bank". More than fifty Palestinian journalists have been killed by Israel since 2001.

Museums

The Israel Museum in Jerusalem is one of Israel's most important cultural institutions and houses the Dead Sea Scrolls, along with an extensive collection of Judaica and European art. Israel's national Holocaust museum, Yad Vashem, is the world central archive of Holocaust-related information. ANU - Museum of the Jewish People on the campus of Tel Aviv University, is an interactive museum devoted to the history of Jewish communities around the world. Apart from the major museums in large cities, there are high-quality art spaces in many towns and kibbutzim. Mishkan LeOmanut in kibbutz Ein Harod Meuhad is the largest art museum in the north of the country.

Israel has the highest number of museums per capita in the world. Several Israeli museums are devoted to Islamic culture, including the Rockefeller Museum and the L. A. Mayer Institute for Islamic Art, both in Jerusalem. The Rockefeller specializes in archaeological remains from the Ottoman and other periods of Middle East history. It is also the home of the first hominid fossil skull found in Western Asia, called Galilee Man. A cast of the skull is on display at the Israel Museum.

Cuisine

Israeli cuisine includes local dishes as well as Jewish cuisine brought to the country by immigrants from the diaspora. Since the establishment of the state in 1948, and particularly since the late 1970s, an Israeli fusion cuisine has developed. Israeli cuisine has adopted, and continues to adapt, elements of the Mizrahi, Sephardi, and Ashkenazi styles of cooking. It incorporates many foods traditionally eaten in the Levantine, Arab, Middle Eastern and Mediterranean cuisines, such as falafel, hummus, shakshouka, couscous, and za'atar. Schnitzel, pizza, hamburgers, French fries, rice and salad are also common in Israel.

Roughly half of the Israeli-Jewish population attests to keeping kosher at home. Kosher restaurants, though rare in the 1960s, make up around a quarter of the total , perhaps reflecting the largely secular values of those who dine out. Hotel restaurants are much more likely to serve kosher food. The non-kosher retail market was traditionally sparse, but grew rapidly and considerably following the influx of immigrants from the post-Soviet states during the 1990s. Together with non-kosher fish, rabbits and ostriches, pork—often called "white meat" in Israel—is produced and consumed, though it is forbidden by both Judaism and Islam.

Sports

The most popular spectator sports in Israel are association football and basketball. The Israeli Premier League is the country's premier football league, and the Israeli Basketball Premier League is the premier basketball league. Maccabi Haifa, Maccabi Tel Aviv, Hapoel Tel Aviv and Beitar Jerusalem are the largest football clubs. Maccabi Tel Aviv, Maccabi Haifa and Hapoel Tel Aviv have competed in the UEFA Champions League and Hapoel Tel Aviv reached the UEFA Cup quarter-finals. Israel hosted and won the 1964 AFC Asian Cup; in 1970 the Israel national football team qualified for the FIFA World Cup, the only time it participated in the World Cup. The 1974 Asian Games, held in Tehran, were the last Asian Games in which Israel participated, plagued by the Arab countries that refused to compete with Israel. Israel was excluded from the 1978 Asian Games and since then has not competed in Asian sport events. In 1994, UEFA agreed to admit Israel, and its football teams now compete in Europe. Maccabi Tel Aviv B.C. has won the European championship in basketball six times. In 2016, the country was chosen as a host for the EuroBasket 2017.

Israel has won nine Olympic medals since its first win in 1992, including a gold medal in windsurfing at the 2004 Summer Olympics. Israel has won over 100 gold medals in the Paralympic Games and is ranked 20th in the all-time medal count. The 1968 Summer Paralympics were hosted by Israel. The Maccabiah Games, an Olympic-style event for Jewish and Israeli athletes, was inaugurated in the 1930s, and has been held every four years since then. Israeli tennis champion Shahar Pe'er ranked 11th in the world on 31 January 2011. Krav Maga, a martial art developed by Jewish ghetto defenders during the struggle against fascism in Europe, is used by the Israeli security forces and police. Its effectiveness and practical approach to self-defense, have won it widespread admiration and adherence around the world.

Chess is a leading sport in Israel and is enjoyed by people of all ages. There are many Israeli grandmasters and Israeli chess players have won a number of youth world championships. Israel stages an annual international championship and hosted the World Team Chess Championship in 2005. The Ministry of Education and the World Chess Federation agreed upon a project of teaching chess within Israeli schools, and it has been introduced into the curriculum of some schools. The city of Beersheba has become a national chess center, with the game being taught in the city's kindergartens. Owing partly to Soviet immigration, it is home to the largest number of chess grandmasters of any city in the world. The Israeli chess team won the silver medal at the 2008 Chess Olympiad and the bronze, coming in third among 148 teams, at the 2010 Olympiad. Israeli grandmaster Boris Gelfand won the Chess World Cup 2009 and the 2011 Candidates Tournament for the right to challenge the world champion. He lost the World Chess Championship 2012 to reigning world champion Anand after a speed-chess tie breaker.

See also
 Index of Israel-related articles
 Outline of Israel

References

Notes

Citations

Sources

External links

 Government
 Official website of the Israel Prime Minister's Office
 Official website of the Israel Central Bureau of Statistics
 The Israel Collection at the National Library of Israel

 General information
 
 Israel at The World Factbook
 Israel at BBC News Online
 Israel at the OECD
 
 

 Maps
 
 

 
1948 establishments in Asia
Arabic-speaking countries and territories
Articles containing video clips
Countries in Asia
Eastern Mediterranean
Jewish polities
States and territories established in 1948
Member states of the Union for the Mediterranean
Member states of the United Nations
Middle Eastern countries
Levant
Western Asian countries
Near Eastern countries

Political entities in the Land of Israel
Republics